"Isn't It True" is the first single from American-Irish band Hope Sandoval & the Warm Inventions' third studio album, Until the Hunter. The song was first released on an opaque-red 7" vinyl for Record Store Day 2016. This vinyl was limited to 2,500 copies worldwide, and was the first release issued by the band through their own independent record label, Tendril Tales. The vinyl contained an exclusive track as its b-side, titled "She's In the Wall". Both songs feature additional musicianship from Jim Putnam of Radar Bros.

A music video for the song was released on April 19, and features vintage photographs and clips that the band described as "lost and found memories." The video is dedicated to Richie Lee of Acetone. On May 13, "Isn't It True" was released as a 1-track digital single. Until the Hunter was released on November 4, 2016.

Track listing

Personnel
Credits adapted from the vinyl liner notes.

Musicians
Hope Sandoval – songwriter, instrumentation, lead vocals, producer, mixing
Colm Ó Cíosóig – songwriter, instrumentation, backing vocals, producer, mixing
Jim Putnam – instrumentation

Technical
 Barry Bödeker — artwork
 Frank Gironda — management

Charts

Release history

External links

"Isn't It True" videoclip on YouTube

References

2016 singles
2016 songs
Record Store Day releases